Joaquín Niemann (born 7 November 1998) is a Chilean professional golfer who currently plays on the LIV Golf League. He has won twice on the PGA Tour. He was the number one ranked amateur golfer from May 2017 to April 2018.

Amateur career
Niemann was the number one ranked golfer in the World Amateur Golf Ranking for 44 weeks, from May 2017 to April 2018, when he turned professional. Niemann planned to play at the University of South Florida, but he was unable to gain entry due to his TOEFL scores.

Niemann won the 2017 Mark H. McCormack Medal for being the top-ranked player in the World Amateur Golf Ranking at the conclusion of the summer's championship season, thus gaining entry into the 2018 U.S. Open and into the 2018 Open Championship. He won the 2018 Latin America Amateur Championship gaining entry also into the 2018 Masters Tournament.

Professional career
Niemann forfeited those exemptions to the 2018 U.S. Open and Open Championship to turn professional before the 2018 Valero Texas Open, where he finished 6th in his first tournament as a professional golfer. He earned Special Temporary Member Status on the PGA Tour for the rest of 2018 with a T6 finish at the Memorial Tournament, his third top-ten in only five starts on tour. He earned a PGA Tour card for the 2018–19 season, after a fourth top-10 finish (T5 at The Greenbrier) in eight tournaments. Niemann joins Jordan Spieth (2013) and Jon Rahm (2016) as golfers who were able to completely bypass the Web.com Tour Finals and earn PGA Tour cards after starting the season without any status.

In September 2019, Niemann won A Military Tribute at The Greenbrier for his first PGA Tour victory. He became the first PGA Tour winner from Chile, and the youngest international PGA Tour winner since 1923.

In December 2019, Niemann played on the International team at the 2019 Presidents Cup at Royal Melbourne Golf Club in Australia. The U.S. team won 16–14. Niemann went 0–3–1 and lost his Sunday singles match against Patrick Cantlay.

In January 2021, Niemann shot a final round 64 at the Sentry Tournament of Champions. He joined Harris English in a playoff, but was defeated on the first extra hole. A week later, he finished T2 at the Sony Open in Hawaii; one stroke behind Kevin Na.

In July 2021, Niemann shot a bogey free 18-under par for 72 holes to tie with Cameron Davis and Troy Merritt for the lead at the Rocket Mortgage Classic. Niemann made his first bogey of the week on the first playoff hole and was eliminated. Davis was the eventual champion.

In February 2022, Niemann shot rounds of 63-63-68-71, to win the Genesis Invitational hosted by Tiger Woods. He finished the tournament at 19-under par, two strokes ahead of Collin Morikawa and Cameron Young. In August 2022, it was announced that Niemann had joined LIV Golf.

Amateur wins
2013 Campeonato Sudamericano Pre Juvenil, Campeonato Abierto de Golf de Temuco
2014 Abierto Club de Polo San Cristobal
2015 Junior Orange Bowl Championship, Abierto Las Brisas de Santo Domingo, IMG Academy Junior World Championships (Boys 15–17), Campeonato Juvenil de Chile, Canadian International Junior Challenge, Abierto Sport Francés
2016 Campeonato Sudamericano Juvenil, Junior Golf World Cup, IMG Academy Junior World Championships (Boys 15–17), Campeonato Juvenil de Chile, Abierto Prince of Wales Country Club, Abierto Sport Francés
2017 Abierto Las Araucarias, TaylorMade-Adidas Golf Junior at Innisbrook, Junior Invitational at Sage Valley, Campeonato Internacional de Aficionados - Mexico
2018 Latin America Amateur Championship

Source:

Professional wins (9)

PGA Tour wins (2)

PGA Tour playoff record (0–2)

Chilean Tour wins (7)

Playoff record
LIV Golf Invitational Series playoff record (0–1)

Results in major championships
Results not in chronological order in 2020.

CUT = missed the half-way cut
"T" = tied
NT = No tournament due to COVID-19 pandemic

Summary

Most consecutive cuts made – 9 (2020 U.S. Open – 2022 Open Championship, current)
Longest streak of top-10s – 0

Results in The Players Championship

"T" indicates a tie for a place

Results in World Golf Championships

1Cancelled due to COVID-19 pandemic

"T" = Tied
NT = No tournament
Note that the Championship and Invitational were discontinued from 2022.

PGA Tour career summary

Niemann was an amateur through the 2018 Masters Tournament.

Team appearances
Amateur
Eisenhower Trophy (representing Chile): 2016

Professional
Presidents Cup (representing the International team): 2019

References

External links

Chilean male golfers
PGA Tour golfers
LIV Golf players
Olympic golfers of Chile
Golfers at the 2020 Summer Olympics
Golfers from Florida
Sportspeople from Santiago
People from Jupiter, Florida
1998 births
Living people
21st-century Chilean people